Gray is the name of several places in the U.S. state of Pennsylvania, including:

 Gray, Blair County, Pennsylvania
 Gray, Somerset County, Pennsylvania